Kobakhia is a Georgian-Abkhazian surname. It may refer to
Valerian Kobakhia (born 1929), Soviet statesman and party leader.
Batal Kobakhia (born 1955), Archeologists, Public figure.
Aslan Kobakhia (born 1960), Vice Premier and Minister for Internal Affairs of Abkhazia
Daur Kobakhia (born 1970), Chairman of the State Committee for Customs of Abkhazia

Surnames of Georgian origin
Georgian-language surnames